Zacharias "Zak" Kostopoulos (22 August 1985 – 21 September 2018) was a Greek-American activist, defending the rights of LGBT people, HIV-positive people, sex workers and refugees. He was also a drag performer under the name Zackie Oh. He was killed at the center of Athens. The trial ended on 3 May 2022, with two men having been found guilty.

Life and career
He was born in the United States of America in 1985 to a Greek immigrant family, came to Greece at the age of seven, went abroad again and returned.

He studied acting and marketing. He worked at the "Athens Check Point", and volunteered with Positive Voice (Association of HIV-positive people of Greece), while writing articles on the internet and in newspapers for issues related to human rights, sexuality and HIV. He was also the president of the Homosexual and Lesbian Community of Greece (OLKE). In the municipal elections of 2014, he stood for election to the Athens municipal council on the electoral list  ('Initiative for a New and Ecological Athens'). In recent years he participated in drag performances in Athens with the alias "Zackie Oh". He was HIV positive.

In 2017, he performed Disco Inferno at the end of Athens Pride.

Death

He was killed on 21 September 2018 at Gladstonos Street in the center of Athens. For his death, 6 people have been charged, but the trial of the case had been postponed due to the measures against COVID-19 pandemic in Greece. However, on October 21, 2021, the trial of six people – including four police officers – began for his murder. On 3 May 2022, two men were found guilty, while the four police officers who faced charges for their involvement were found innocent.

Legacy
Kostopoulos was buried in the town of Kirra where he grew up. Since 2018, activists like Menelas Siafakas organize yearly marches in Athens to commemorate Kostopoulos' death and call for justice against his killers. The slogans "Zackie lives, smash the Nazis" (which rhymes in Greek) and "cops, TV, neo-Nazis, all the bastards work together" were chanted at events across the country.

In 2019, Nasos Iliopoulos, who is the leader of the Syriza faction inside the Municipal Council of Athens, proposed the renaming of Gladstonos street to Zak Kostopoulos street. The Mayor of Athens, Kostas Bakoyannis, responded with a counter-proposal to create a monument against intolerance, racism, and hatred, which the majority voted in favor.

In 2021, a scientific researcher of the Aristotle University of Thessaloniki, named two newly discovered species of cyanobacteria, the Iphianassa zackieohae and the Speos fyssasii, after the activists Zak Kostopoulos and Pavlos Fyssas respectively.

References

1985 births
2018 deaths
American murder victims
Greek murder victims
Male murder victims
Deaths by beating in Europe
2018 murders in Greece
Gay politicians
American gay actors
American gay writers
American drag queens
20th-century Greek LGBT people
21st-century Greek LGBT people
Greek gay actors
Greek gay writers
Greek drag queens
American LGBT journalists
LGBT people from New York (state)
American LGBT rights activists
HIV/AIDS activists
People with HIV/AIDS
Greek LGBT rights activists
2018 in LGBT history